Jajja Abbasian Railway Station is  located in khanpur district Rahim Yar Khan Pakistan. This railway station was built by Nawab Sadiq who was Nawab of Bahawalpur.

See also
 List of railway stations in Pakistan
 Pakistan Railways

References

External links

Railway stations in Rahim Yar Khan District
Railway stations on Khanpur–Chachran Railway